The Auburn Tigers college football team represents Auburn University in the West Division of the Southeastern Conference (SEC). The Tigers compete as part of the NCAA Division I Football Bowl Subdivision. The program has had 27 head coaches, and 2 interim head coaches, since it began play during the 1892 season. The Tigers current head coach is Hugh Freeze.

The team has played more than 1,250 games over 119 seasons. In that time, seven coaches have led the Tigers in postseason bowl games: Jack Meagher, Ralph Jordan, Pat Dye, Terry Bowden, Tommy Tuberville, Gene Chizik, and Gus Malzahn. Seven coaches won conference championships: Walter H. Watkins and Mike Donahue won a combined three as a member of the Southern Intercollegiate Athletic Association; Chet A. Wynne won one as a member of the Southern Conference; and Jordan, Dye, Tuberville, and Chizik won a combined seven as a member of the SEC. During their tenures, Jordan and Chizik each won a national championship with the Tigers.

Jordan is the leader in seasons coached and games won, with 176 victories during his 25 years with the program. M. S. Harvey and Johnny Floyd have the lowest winning percentage of those who have coached more than one game, with .000. Of the 26 different head coaches who have led the Tigers, John Heisman, Donahue, Jordan and Dye have been inducted as head coaches into the College Football Hall of Fame.

Key

Coaches

Notes

References 
General

 
 

Specific

Lists of college football head coaches

Alabama sports-related lists